This is for the village in Central Serbia, for the one in Montenegro, see Kaludra, Berane

The village has less than 450 citizens.

External links
 Levac Online
 Articles about Kaludra.
 Pictures from Kaludra.

Populated places in Pomoravlje District
Šumadija